The Beverly Toon House is a property in Franklin, Tennessee, United States, that was listed on the National Register of Historic Places in 1988.  It has also been known as Riverside.  It dates from c. 1857.

A 1988 study of Williamson County historical resources assessed that this house was one of the "best two-story vernacular I-House examples" in the county. The others highly rated were the William King House, the Alpheus Truett House, the Thomas Brown House, the Claiborne Kinnard House, and the Stokely Davis House.

References

Central-passage houses in Tennessee
Greek Revival houses in Tennessee
Houses completed in 1857
Houses on the National Register of Historic Places in Tennessee
Houses in Franklin, Tennessee
National Register of Historic Places in Williamson County, Tennessee
1857 establishments in Tennessee